Hankins is a hamlet (and census-designated place) in Sullivan County, New York, United States. Hankins has a post office with ZIP code 12741.

References

Hamlets in Sullivan County, New York
Hamlets in New York (state)